William Joseph may refer to:

William Joseph (governor), colonial governor of Maryland
William Joseph (musician), American pianist and recording artist
William Joseph (American football), American football player
Will Joseph (rugby union, born 1877), Welsh rugby union player
Will Joseph (rugby union, born 2002), English rugby union player

See also